Wayside Chapel is a chapel in Rosamond, California. It was built in the 1940s, funded largely by George Hummel, who sold off Mission land in lots to pay for it. Thomas Irvin Bailey was a pastor here from 1968.

References

External links
Official site

Churches in Kern County, California
Rosamond, California